December's Child is the fifth album from The Original Harmony Ridge Creekdippers released in 2002.

Reception

Writing for Allmusic, music critic Steve Kurutz praised the album's "minimalist approach" and wrote "Whether singing about around-the-clock meth labs or newspaper roses sold by the side of the road, he creates fully realized worlds within each song on December's Child. The lo-fi folk vibe of the earlier self-released Creekdippers recordings and 2000's My Own Jo Ellen remains... but the electricity and amplification have been turned up a bit, too—rather than deliberately eschewed as he seemed to prefer after first going relatively solo."

Track listing
All songs by Mark Olson except as noted.

 "How Can I Send Tonight (There to Tell You)" – 3:46
 "Still We Have a Friend in You" – 3:52
 "Alta's Song" – 3:49
 "Back to the Old Homeplace" – 2:29
 "December's Child" – 4:21
 "Nerstrand Woods" – 4:38
 "Cactus Wren" – 4:41
 "Climb These Steps (We Will)" – 3:24
 "How Can This Be" – 3:18
 "Say You'll be Mine" (Olson, Gary Louris) – 4:01
 "One Eyed Black Dog Moses" (Olson, Victoria Williams) – 5:59

Personnel
Mark Olson – vocals, banjo, bass, dulcimer, guitar, piano
Danny Frankel – drums, percussion
Don Heffington – drums, background vocals
Gary Louris – guitar, vocals on "Say You'll be Mine"
Michael Russell – bass, mandolin, viola, violin, background vocals
Victoria Williams – banjo, guitar, harmonica, background vocals
David Wolfenberger – bass, background vocals
Jon Birdsong – trumpet

Production notes
Mark Olson – producer
Charlie McGovern – engineer, mastering, mixing
Jeffrey Reed – engineer

References

2002 albums
Mark Olson (musician) albums